Yangon Technological University (YTU), located in BPI, Yangon, is the premier engineering university of Myanmar. Established as Department of Engineering under Rangoon University in 1924, and popularly known by its former name Rangoon Institute of Technology (RIT), YTU is the country's oldest and largest engineering university, and the best engineering university in Myanmar. The university offers bachelor's, master's and doctorate degree programs in engineering disciplines to nearly 8000 students.

YTU is also a member of Southeast Asia Engineering Education Development Network (AUN/SEED-Net), and Greater Mekong Sub-region Academic and Research Network (GMSARN).

History

The university traces its origins to Rangoon University's Department of Engineering established in 1924 during the British colonial period. In the beginning, the department was located in the extended compound of Rangoon General Hospital in downtown Yangon and consisted of two lecturers and 17 students. In 1927, it became a separate entity, BOC College of Engineering and Mining, named after Burmah Oil Company, and was moved four miles north. Civil Engineering was the only program offered until 1938 when a combined Mechanical and Electrical Engineering program was added.

After World War II, in 1946, the college became the Faculty of Engineering of Rangoon University. After Burma's independence in 1948, the college added Mining, Chemical, Metallurgy and Architecture programs in 1954 and a Textile Engineering program in 1955.

In 1961, the college became Burma Institute of Technology (BIT) of Rangoon University and was moved to the current building complex in Gyogone built by the Soviet Union. In 1964, BIT was renamed Rangoon Institute of Technology (RIT) and, more importantly, made an independent university under the Ministry of Education. RIT began conferring Bachelor of Engineering and Master of Engineering degrees instead of Bachelor of Science (Engineering) and Master Science (Engineering) degrees, hitherto offered at Rangoon University. The university expanded its bachelor's and master's degree offerings to the current 11 disciplines over the years. The PhD programs were added only in 1997.

The university was renamed Yangon Institute of Technology (YIT) in 1990 and was placed under the Ministry of Science and Technology in 1997. In 1998, the name of the university was changed to Yangon Technological University (YTU). In 1999, a new campus located six miles west of Gyogone in Hlaingtharya was opened. Until 1991, when Mandalay Institute of Technology was founded, the university was the only senior engineering university in the country, along with several Government Technical Institutes (GTIs), which offered two-year engineering diplomas. In 2012, both Yangon Technological University (YTU) and Mandalay Technological University (MTU) started to accept the best and most outstanding students around the country to undergraduate programs and they are called as Center of Excellence (COE).

Programs
YTU maintains 18 academic departments: Civil Engineering, Mechanical Engineering, Electrical Power Engineering, Electronic Engineering, Telecommunications engineering (by Electronic Engineering department), Computer Engineering and Information Technology, Mechatronic Engineering, Chemical Engineering, Textile Engineering, Food engineering (by Chemical engineering department), Mining Engineering, Petroleum Engineering, Materials Science and Metallurgy Engineering, Biotechnology, Architecture, Engineering Geology, Engineering Physics, Engineering Chemistry, Engineering Mathematics, and Languages.

Most YTU students are enrolled full-time in engineering programs although over 2000 students are also enrolled in part-time programs. Of the nearly 11,000 students who graduated between 1997 and 2004, a little over 50% received bachelor's degrees, 10% master's, 4.5% postgraduate diploma, 32.5% undergraduate diploma, and 2.4% Ph.D.

Engineering
The university offers six-year B.E. and B.Arch. programs and two-year M.E. and M.Arch. programs. The Ph.D. programs last between three and five years. Students are accepted to YTU's undergraduate programs based on their scores from the annual university entrance examinations.

Postgraduate studies
The following one-year postgraduate diploma, two-year master's and doctoral programs are offered in applied sciences. The university had 322 postgraduate students in the 2007–2008 academic year.

Undergraduate diplomas
The university offers one-year Diploma in Technology degrees in the following:
 Architectural Design and Planning
 Civil
 Chemical
 Food Technology
 Electrical Power
 Electronics Technology
 Computer Engineering and Information Technology 
 Mechanical
 Metallurgical
 Mineral
 Mining
 Petroleum
 Telecommunication
 Textile

Campus
The university consists of the main campus in Gyogone and a smaller campus in Hlaingthaya Township, six miles west.

The main campus, built between 1958 and 1961 with aid from the Soviet Union, comprises eight main buildings, all interlinked by rain-proof corridors. The main hall and administrative departments are in Building 1. Buildings 5-8 house the School of Architecture and laboratory rooms. The library is near Building 1. The campus also includes a Recreational Centre, a football pitch, a canteen with many restaurants, and a carpark. Faculty residences are located in the back of the campus. Seven halls (named Block A through Block G) are accepted again as dormitory halls in December 2013.

Faculty and alumni

List of rectors

Alumni
As YTU was the only senior university in the country until 1991, most senior engineers in Burma hail from RIT/YTU. However, many alumni and former faculty members have left the country for work, further studies, or both. The largest group of overseas alumni are believed to be in Singapore

Students

Number of enrolled students

Number of graduated students
Under Ministry of Education (from 1927 to 1996)

Under Ministry of Science and Technology (from 1997 to present)

International affiliations
YTU is a member of Southeast Asia Engineering Education Development Network (AUN/SEED-Net), and Greater Mekong Sub-region Academic and Research Network (GMSARN). The university has academic affiliations with University of Karlsruhe (Germany), Shibaura Institute of Technology (Japan), Asian Institute of Technology (Thailand) and Mae Fah Luang University (Thailand).

Repression by the Junta Regime
The bloody events that occurred in the university campus in March 1988 set the stage for the famous 8888 uprising of Myanmar which set the country's political course over the next three decades.
Ko Phone Maw, a fifth-year chemical engineering student from the Rangoon Institute of Technology, in the campus was shot dead in the campus by the Riot Police during a protest regarding a brawl with youths from west Gyogone ward.Five other students were injured. One of the injured students, Ko Soe Naing, a fifth-year mining engineering student, later died on the hospital.

Protests after the deaths of Ko Phone Maw and other students escalated and on March 15, 1988, the military raided the university and arrested hundreds of students. University was closed and students were forced back to return their homes.

On March 17, 1988. students from the Rangoon University protested against the Rangoon Institute of Technology raid were brutally dispersed at Tada Phyu, Pyay Road, Yangon. Dozens of students were killed and injured and hundreds of students were detained.

Subsequent protests after brutal crackdowns escalated into a national uprising against the Socialist government that resulted in the resignation of the dictator Ne Win in July 1988.

See also
 Mandalay Technological University
 Technological University (Hmawbi)
 Technological University, Thanlyin
 West Yangon Technological University
 List of Technological Universities in Myanmar

References

External links
USA YIT Alumni
Singapore YIT Alumni
Myanmar Engineering Society
RIT Alumni
1987 Batch RIT
Yangon Technological University Official Web Site

Universities and colleges in Yangon
Technological universities in Myanmar
Universities and colleges in Myanmar